Sarah Elizabeth Royle Walker  (born 11 March 1943) is an English mezzo-soprano.

Walker was born in Cheltenham, Gloucestershire. She studied at the Royal College of Music from 1961 to 1965, initially as a violinist and cellist, and went on to study singing with Vera Rózsa. She has appeared in numerous opera performances and is also known as a concert soloist and recitalist.

Operatic career
Walker's operatic debut was in 1969, as Ottavia in Kent Opera's production of L'incoronazione di Poppea. She has also appeared in Britain with Glyndebourne Festival Opera, The Royal Opera, English National Opera, Scottish Opera, and abroad at The Metropolitan Opera (New York City), Lyric Opera of Chicago, San Francisco Opera, La Monnaie (Brussels) and the Vienna State Opera.

Notable roles have included the title-roles in Gloriana and Maria Stuarda, Dido in Les Troyens and Baba the Turk in The Rake's Progress. She recorded the challenging Voices under the direction of its composer, Hans Werner Henze, in 1978.

In 1989, Walker, along with June Anderson (Coloratura Soprano), Klaus König (tenor), and Jan-Hendrik Rootering (bass-baritone), was led under the baton of Leonard Bernstein in a performance of Beethoven's 9th Symphony. The performance was celebrating the fall of the Berlin Wall on Christmas. These four soloists were accompanied by a massive choir and orchestra made up of many nationalities: from Germany, the Bavarian Radio Symphony Orchestra and Chorus, the Chorus of the Berlin Radio Symphony Orchestra, and members of the Sächsische Staatskapelle Dresden; from the Soviet Union, members of the Orchestra of the Kirov Theatre, from the United Kingdom, members of the London Symphony Orchestra; from the USA, members of the New York Philharmonic, and from France, members of the Opéra de Paris.

Other activities
Her professional debut in recital was reportedly at the Wigmore Hall, and she has since toured Europe, the Americas, Australia and elsewhere. Walker is Prince Consort Professor of Singing at the Royal College of Music and runs the "Creative Voices" course at the Guildhall School of Music & Drama. She is a Fellow of both colleges. She also is on the Vocal Faculty at the Royal Academy of Music. Walker is an advocate of lieder singing and the song repertoire, and is a patron of the London Song Festival, founded in 2007 to promote the song repertoire. In the 1990s, she collaborated with French & Saunders for their opera diva sketch singing their version of "I Should Be So Lucky" (original by Kylie Minogue).

Recordings
Her recordings include song recitals of works by Fauré with the Nash Ensemble, Schubert, Schumann, Brahms and Dvořák songs, and French songs by Duparc, Enesco, Roussel and Debussy with Roger Vignoles; The Rake's Progress conducted by Riccardo Chailly, the Mozart Requiem conducted by George Guest, Tippett's The Mask of Time conducted by Andrew Davis, Vaughan Williams's Hugh the Drover conducted by Matthew Best and a CD of comic songs ranging from Gershwin to Schoenberg, recorded at the Wigmore Hall in 1988, entitled 'Blah Blah Blah and other trifles'. She appears as Cornelia in the ENO production of Handel's Julius Caesar conducted by Charles Mackerras and directed by John Copley.

Sources
Who's Who in British Opera ed. Nicky Adam (Scolar Press, 1993)

External links
 Sarah Walker's website
 [ profile on Allmusic.com]
 Masterclasses in London
  .

1943 births
Living people
People from Cheltenham
Alumni of the Royal College of Music
Academics of the Royal College of Music
Commanders of the Order of the British Empire
Operatic mezzo-sopranos
English mezzo-sopranos
Musicians from Gloucestershire
Women music educators
20th-century British women opera singers
21st-century British women opera singers